L'Egisto (Aegisthus) is a 1643 opera in a prologue and three acts by Francesco Cavalli. It was designated as a favola dramatica musicale. The Italian libretto was by Giovanni Faustini, his second text for Cavalli.

Performance history
It was first performed in Venice at the Teatro San Cassiano in 1643. Highly successful in its day, it was subsequently performed throughout Italy.

Rarely performed in modern times, the opera's US premiere was given by The Santa Fe Opera on 1 August 1972. Its UK premiere was given by Scottish Opera at the Theatre Royal, Glasgow on 13 January 1982. The production was toured in 1982 and 1984. Both of these productions used a modern edition by Raymond Leppard.

A new edition prepared and directed by Marcio da Silva was performed by HGO at The Cockpit Theatre, London in June 2021.

Roles

Synopsis
The Egisto of this opera is not the Aegisthus of the Odyssey. This Egisto is a descendant of the sun-god Apollo, and for that reason is treated as an enemy by the goddess Venus. Over a year before the action begins he loved Clori and she returned his love. While spending time together on the seashore on the island of Delos, they were captured by pirates and sold separately into captivity. Climene, a young woman on the island of Zakynthos, was captured roughly at the same time by the same pirates on the very day of her marriage to Lidio. She was sold to the same cruel master as Egisto. A year later, they have managed to escape and Egisto has escorted Climene back to Zakynthos, where the main action takes place. They both set out to find their original lovers. What they do not know is that the pirates brought Clori to Zakynthos, where she fell in love with Lidio. Climene's brother, Ipparco, also fell in love with her.

The division into acts reflects the passage of the day from dawn through night to dawn again, to parallel Egisto's heritage as a descendant of the Sun.

Time: Legendary
Place: The island of Zakynthos

Act 1
Set during the morning of the day after Egisto and Climene have landed on the island, the situation of the two mis-matched couples is established. Lidio and Clori are lovers while Egisto and Climene are friends.

Act 2
In the afternoon, Egisto and Climene are trying to get back to their former lovers, only to be rejected by them.

Act 3
When the night falls, we see the machinations of the gods behind the sufferings of the characters on earth. Lidio is captured by Ipparco, and Egisto goes mad. The story is however brought to a happy conclusion.

References
Notes

Sources
 
 
 Libretto of the opera

Operas
Operas by Francesco Cavalli
Operas based on classical mythology
1643 operas
Operas set in Greece
Italian-language operas
Opera world premieres at the Teatro San Cassiano